Stefanos Evangelou (born 12 May 1998) is a Greek professional footballer who plays as a centre-back for Moldovan Super Liga club Sheriff Tiraspol.

Career
Evangelou plays mainly as a centre-back and joined Panathinaikos from Panionios in the summer of 2015. In January 2017, he made his debut with the club in a Greek Cup match against Kissamikos.

On 5 October 2020, Evangelou signed with Górnik Zabrze for two years, with a two-year option, for an undisclosed fee. On 8 September 2021, he left the club by mutual consent.

Sheriff Tiraspol
In 2021 he moved to Sheriff Tiraspol in Moldova. In his first season with the club, he won the 2021–22 Moldovan National Division and the 2021–22 Moldovan Cup.

Career statistics

Club

Honours
Sheriff Tiraspol 
 Moldovan National Division: 2021–22
 Moldovan Cup: 2021–22

References

External links

pao.gr

1998 births
Living people
Greece under-21 international footballers
Greece youth international footballers
Greek expatriate footballers
Panathinaikos F.C. players
Olympiacos F.C. players
PAS Giannina F.C. players
Górnik Zabrze players
FC Sheriff Tiraspol players
Super League Greece players
Ekstraklasa players
Association football defenders
Footballers from Athens
Greek footballers
Expatriate footballers in Poland
Greek expatriate sportspeople in Poland
Expatriate footballers in Moldova
Greek expatriate sportspeople in Moldova
Panionios F.C. players